Ločica ob Savinji is a settlement on the left bank of the Savinja River in the Municipality of Polzela in Slovenia. The area is part of the traditional region of Styria. The municipality is now included in the Savinja Statistical Region.

Name
The name of the settlement was changed from Ločica to Ločica ob Savinji in 1953.

Cultural heritage
An archaeological site in the settlement has revealed remains of a Roman military encampment dating to the Marcomannic Wars in the late 2nd century AD.

References

External links

Ločica ob Savinji on Geopedia

Populated places in the Municipality of Polzela